Georgios Matsades (born 6 July 1999) is a Greek professional footballer who plays as a forward for Super League 2 club Panathinaikos B.

References

1999 births
Living people
Greece youth international footballers
Gamma Ethniki players
Super League Greece 2 players
Ethnikos Piraeus F.C. players
Panathinaikos F.C. players
Panathinaikos F.C. B players
Association football forwards
Footballers from Athens
Greek footballers